Those Who Dance is a 1924 American silent drama film produced by Thomas H. Ince and directed by Lambert Hillyer. Released by Associated First National, the film stars Blanche Sweet, Bessie Love, and Warner Baxter. It is based on a story by George Kibbe Turner.

Warner Bros. later inherited First National in a merger and remade the film in 1930 as Those Who Dance, which exists at the Library of Congress. It is not known whether the 1924 film currently survives, and it may be a lost film.

Plot 
When a young lawyer (Baxter)'s sister is killed in a bootleg liquor-related accident, he seeks justice by joining the prohibition force. A young man (Agnew) is wrongfully suspected of a crime, so his sister (Sweet) seeks evidence to set him free. The lawyer and young woman pose as a couple to infiltrate the underworld.

Cast

Reception 
The film received positive reviews. Blanche Sweet's performance was praised, and Bessie Love's received even higher praise for playing—against type—an underworld flapper.

See also 
 Blanche Sweet filmography

References

External links 

 
 
 
 Still of Bessie Love and Blanche Sweet

1924 drama films
1924 lost films
1924 films
American black-and-white films
Silent American drama films
American silent feature films
Films about prohibition in the United States
Films based on short fiction
Films directed by Lambert Hillyer
First National Pictures films
Lost American films
Lost drama films
1920s American films